Juichi Tsushima (1888–1967) was the 7th President of the Japanese Olympic Committee (1959–1962). He was a graduate of the University of Tokyo. From 1957 to 1958 he was Director General of the Japan Defense Agency.

|-

|-

|-

|-

|-

|-

1888 births
1967 deaths
Members of the Japanese Olympic Committee
Government ministers of Japan
Ministers of Finance of Japan
Japanese defense ministers
Japanese military personnel of World War II
University of Tokyo alumni